Cushing Municipal Airport  is two miles south of Cushing, in Payne County, Oklahoma. The National Plan of Integrated Airport Systems for 2021-2025 categorized it as a general aviation airport.

Facilities
The airport covers 672 acres (272 ha) at an elevation of 925 feet (282 m). Runway 18/36 is concrete, 5,201 by 100 feet (1,585 x 30 m); three runways are grass: 2/20 is 2,650 by 60 feet (808 x 18 m), 8/26 is 2,700 by 40 feet (823 x 12 m), and 11/29 is 2,500 by 50 feet (762 x 15 m).

In the year ending September 23, 2011 the airport had 2,500 general aviation aircraft operations, average 208 per month. 16 aircraft were then based at this airport: 88% single-engine, 6% jet, and 6% helicopter.

References

External links 
 Cushing Municipal Airport (AQR) at Oklahoma Aeronautics Commission
 Cushing Flight Service, the fixed-base operator (FBO)
 Aerial image as of February 1995 from USGS The National Map
 

Airports in Oklahoma
Buildings and structures in Payne County, Oklahoma